EchoStar XVII or EchoStar 17, also known as Jupiter 1, is an American geostationary high throughput communications satellite which is operated by Hughes Network Systems, a subsidiary of EchoStar. It is positioned in geostationary orbit at a longitude of 107.1° West, from where it is used for satellite internet access over HughesNet.

EchoStar XVII was built by Space Systems/Loral, and is based on the LS-1300 satellite bus. It carries sixty  (NATO K band) transponders which is used to cover North America.

EchoStar XVII was launched by Arianespace, using an Ariane 5ECA carrier rocket flying from ELA-3 at Kourou. The spacecraft was launched at 21:36 UTC on 5 July 2012. The MSG-3 weather satellite was launched aboard the same rocket, mounted below EchoStar XVII, which was atop a Sylda 5 adaptor. The launch successfully placed both satellites into a geosynchronous transfer orbit. EchoStar XVII used its own propulsion system to manoeuvre into a geostationary orbit.

Path to geostationary orbit

See also

 ViaSat-1  – Similar high throughput satellite that was the source of a lawsuit to the manufacturer of both
 2012 in spaceflight

References

Spacecraft launched in 2012
High throughput satellites
Communications satellites in geostationary orbit
Ariane commercial payloads
E17